A list of films released in Japan in 2006 (see 2006 in film).

Highest-grossing films

List of films

External links
 Japanese films of 2006 at the Internet Movie Database
 2006 in Japan
 2006 in Japanese television
 List of 2006 box office number-one films in Japan

2006
Japanese
Films